Giraffe is a restaurant chain headquartered in Birmingham, United Kingdom, which was founded in 1998 in Hampstead as Giraffe Restaurants by Juliette Joffe, Russel Joffe and Andrew Jacobs. Giraffe was owned by its founders, with additional financial backing from private shareholders, 3i investment group and chairman Luke Johnson.

In October 2006, 3i invested £10 million in the company in a deal that valued the chain at £24 million. It was announced in March 2013 that the chain was to be acquired by Tesco for £48.6m. As part of the acquisition, 3i and Risk Capital Partners sold their shares in the company. In June 2016, Tesco reached an agreement to sell the company to Boparan Holdings.

Branches

As of August 2022, the company has 17 outlets across the UK plus three at Dubai Airport in the United Arab Emirates and two at Malaga Airport in Spain. 

In September 2016, the company introduced a new brand, Giraffe World Kitchen, with its first branch in Basingstoke. However, in March 2019, Boparan announced that 20 branches had been tagged for closure “to protect the company”, which had made a pre-tax loss of £10m on sales of £67m.

References

External links
 
 

Restaurant groups in the United Kingdom
3i Group companies
Restaurants established in 1998
1998 establishments in the United Kingdom